Allacanthos is a genus of crabs in the family Pseudothelphusidae

Species
 Allacanthos pittieri (Rathbun, 1898)
 Allacanthos yawi Magalhaes, Lara & Wehrtmann, 2010

References

Pseudothelphusidae
Freshwater crustaceans of South America